HD 37974 (or R 126) a variable B[e] hypergiant in the Large Magellanic Cloud. It is surrounded by an unexpected dust disk.

Properties
R126, formally RMC (Radcliffe observatory Magellanic Cloud) 126, is a massive luminous star with several unusual properties. It exhibits the B[e] phenomenon where forbidden emission lines appear in the spectrum due to extended circumstellar material. Its spectrum also shows normal (permitted) emission lines formed in denser material closer to the star, indicative of a power stellar wind. The spectra include silicate and polycyclic aromatic hydrocarbon (PAH) features that suggest a dusty disc.

The star itself is a hot supergiant thought to be seventy times more massive than the sun and over a million times more luminous. It has evolved away from the main sequence (being an O-class star, when it was in MS) and is so luminous and large that it is losing material through its stellar wind over a billion times faster than the sun. It would lose more material than the sun contains in about 25,000 years.

It is expected to evolve into Wolf–Rayet star in several hundred thousand years.

Dusty disc
The dust cloud around R126 is surprising because stars as massive as these were thought to be inhospitable to planet formation due to powerful stellar winds making it difficult for dust particles to condense. The nearby hypergiant HD 268835 shows similar features and is also likely to have a dusty disc, so R126 is not unique.

The disc extends outwards for 60 times the size of Pluto's orbit around the sun, and probably contains as much material as the entire Kuiper belt. It is unclear whether such a disc represents the first or last stages of the planet-forming process.

Variability

The brightness of R126 varies in an unpredictable way by around 0.6 magnitude over timescales of tens to hundreds of days. The faster variations are characteristic of α Cygni variables, irregular pulsating supergiants. The slower variations are accompanied by changes in the colour of the star, with it being redder when it is visually brighter, typical of the S Doradus phases of luminous blue variables.

References

Stars in the Large Magellanic Cloud
Dorado (constellation)
B-type hypergiants
Large Magellanic Cloud
R126
037974
Alpha Cygni variables
B(e) stars
J05362586-6922558
CPD-69 420